is a town located in Gunma Prefecture, Japan. , the town had an estimated population of 18,383 in 7938 households, and a population density of 24 persons per km². Much of the town is within the borders of Jōshin'etsu-kōgen National Park.

Geography
Located in northern Gunma, Minakami is bordered by Niigata Prefecture to the north. The town is very mountainous.

 Mountains: Mount Mikuni (1636m), Mount Sennokura (2026m), Mount Ōmine, Mount Tanigawa (1977m), Asahidake (1945m), Mount Hiragatake (2141m)
 Rivers: Tone River, Akatani River
 Lakes: Lake Okutone, Lake Naramata, Lake Fujiwara, Lake Dogen
 Dams: Yagisawa Dam, Naramata Dam, Fujiwara Dam, Aimata Dam, Sudagai Dam

Surrounding municipalities
Gunma Prefecture
 Numata
 Kawaba
 Katashina
Nakanojō
Niigata Prefecture
 Uonuma
 Minamiuonuma
 Yuzawa

Climate
Minakami has a Humid continental climate (Köppen Dfa) characterized by warm summers and cold winters with heavy snowfall.  The average annual temperature in Minakami is 6.8 °C. The average annual rainfall is 1864 mm with September as the wettest month. The temperatures are highest on average in August, at around 18.6 °C, and lowest in January, at around -5.2 °C.

Demographics
Per Japanese census data, the population of Minakami has declined steadily over the past 60 years.

History
The Mikuni Kaidō connecting Takasaki with Niigata from the Heian period onwards passed through area of present-day Minakami, with nine post stations. The area was contested between the competing Uesugi, Takeda and Sanada clans during the Sengoku period. During the Edo period, it was partly under the control of Numata Domain , with the remainder as part of the tenryō holdings within Kōzuke Province administered directly by the Tokugawa shogunate during the Edo period. On April 1, 1889 with the creation of the modern municipalities system after the Meiji Restoration, Minakami village was established within Tone District, Gunma. It was raised to town status on August 10, 1947. On October 1, 2005, the town of Tsukiyono and the village of Niiharu were merged into Minakami.

Government
Minakami has a mayor-council form of government with a directly elected mayor and a unicameral town council of 18 members. Minakami, together with the other municipalities in Tone District, contributes one member to the Gunma Prefectural Assembly. In terms of national politics, the town is part of Gunma 1st district of the lower house of the Diet of Japan.

Economy
The economy of Minakami is heavily dependent on seasonal tourism to ski resorts and to onsen hot springs.

Education
Minakami has six public elementary schools and three public middle school operated by the town government, and one public high school operated by the Gunma Prefectural Board of Education.

Transportation

Railway
 JR East – Jōetsu Shinkansen

 JR East – Jōetsu Line
 -  -  -  -

Highways
  – Tsukiyono IC, Minakami IC

International relations
 - Huntsville, Texas, United States, sister city since April 1991 with former Niihari village
 - Uherský Brod, Czech Republic, sister city since November 1995 with former Tsukiyono town
 – Tainan, Republic of China, friendship city since December 2013

Local attractions

Onsen (Hot Springs)
Minakami has traditionally been an Onsen (hot spring) resort town with 8 major onsen sources and over 40 different bathing facilities to choose from.

Ski Fields
Minakami has a good reputation for good snow conditions. There are 9 ski areas:
Minakami Houdaigi
Minakami Kogen
Minakami Kogen Fujiwara
Oana
Tanigawadake Tenjindaira
Norn Minakami
Tanigawa Onsen White Valley
Kanosawa Ski Area
Akazawa Ski Area

Outdoor
There are many different outdoor pursuits available in Minakami and it has become a very popular destination for outdoor adventure seekers. Some of the outdoor activities include:
 Whitewater rafting (grade 2- 4)
 Canyoning
 Bungy Jumping
 Mountain biking
 Paragliding
 Rock climbing
 Hiking
 Canoeing
 Kayaking
 Snowshoe
 Back country ski & snowboarding
 Caving

Noted people from Minakami
Kotoinazuma Yoshihiro, sumo wrestler

References

External links

Official Website 

Towns in Gunma Prefecture
Minakami, Gunma